Brett Wilkinson (born May 2, 1976 in Hyde Park, New York) is a former member of the U.S. National Rowing Team. Wilkinson began his rowing career at Franklin Delano Roosevelt High School and later rowed for Bucknell University. After college, he was a member of the Potomac Boat Club in Washington, D.C. where he qualified for the U.S. National Rowing Team.

He competed in the 2004 Summer Olympics in Athens in the men's quadruple sculls with teammates Ben Holbrook, Sloan DuRoss and Kent Smack, finishing 11th overall. Wilkinson also represented the United States in several World Championships, rowing in the men's double and quadruple sculls.

Wilkinson was a member of the team of engineers who worked to rebuild the Pentagon after the 9/11 terrorist attacks.

References
Citations

Sources
 

1976 births
Living people
People from Hyde Park, New York
Rowers at the 2004 Summer Olympics
Olympic rowers of the United States
American male rowers